Lisduff may refer to:

Northern Ireland
Lisduff, County Tyrone, a townland in County Tyrone

Republic of Ireland
Lisduff, County Cavan, a townland in County Cavan
Lisduff, County Cork, a region within the village of Whitechurch in County Cork
Lisduff, County Laois, a townland in County Laois
Lisduff, County Leitrim, a townland in County Leitrim
Lisduff, County Westmeath, a townland in the civil parish of Street, barony of Moygoish